The Estonia electoral district was a constituency created for the 1917 Russian Constituent Assembly election. The electoral district covered the Autonomous Governorate of Estonia.

Voter turnout stood at 56.6% in the Estonia electoral district.

Notably, the Bolsheviks benefited from popular discontent with the failure of the Provisional Government to follow through on its promises of self-determination for Estonia. The Bolsheviks and Estonian Labour Party had their strongest support in Reval and northern Estonia. Bolsheviks obtained 22,003 votes (47.6%) in Reval, the Estonian Labour Party obtained 13,855 votes (29.9%), the Estonian Democratic Party 4,735 votes (10.2%), Estonian Social Democrats 2,689 votes (5.8%), Radical Democrats 1,136 votes (2.4%), Russian SRs 1,135 votes (2.4%) and Estonian SRs 787 votes (1.7%).

The Democratic Bloc obtained 53.4% of the votes in Tartu, and did also get a good number of votes in southern Estonia.

Soldiers stationed at garrisons in Estonia didn't vote in the Estonian district, but in the Baltic Fleet constituency.

Results

References

Electoral districts of the Russian Constituent Assembly election, 1917
Governorate of Estonia